The Ramadan T20 Cup, sponsored as the Advance Telecom Ramadan T20 Cup, was a one-off a professional Twenty20 cricket tournament held in Karachi, Pakistan from 6 to 25 July 2013, during the holy month of Ramadan. The cup was contested by different departments as opposed to the regional associations that competed in the Faysal Bank T20 Cup.

The tournament was contested by ten teams through a round-robin group stage, followed by semi-finals and a final.

 won the cup in a one-over eliminator, after the final against  resulted in a tie.

Venue
All 23 matches were played at the National Stadium in Karachi.

Group stage

Tables

Results 
All times shown are in Pakistan Standard Time (UTC+05).

Group A

Group B

Knockout stage

Semi-finals

Final

See also

 List of domestic Twenty20 cricket competitions

References

External links
 Tournament Site on PCB Official Website
 Tournament Site on ESPN Cricinfo
 Tournament Site on Cricket Archive

Twenty20 cricket leagues
Pakistani domestic cricket competitions
2013 establishments in Pakistan
Cricket
Sports leagues established in 2013
Defunct cricket leagues
Recurring sporting events established in 2013
Recurring sporting events disestablished in 2013
2013 disestablishments in Pakistan
2013 in Pakistani cricket
Domestic cricket competitions in 2012–13